Machghara, also spelled Mashghara, is a town in the Beqaa Valley of Lebanon, situated in the Western Beqaa District and south of the Beqaa Governorate. It lies just to the northwest of Sohmor and southwest of Lake Qaraoun, south of Aitanit and north of Ain Et Tine. The Iskander Spring lies to the northeast of the village.

Geography 
The city is located at an average of 1,050 meters above sea level, more than 200 meters above the course of the Litani River. It leans against the eastern slope of the Mount Lebanon massif. Machghara is part of the Western Beqaa District Caza which has 18 localities.

People from Machghara
Al-Hurr al-Amili (1624 – 1693)
Zaki Nassif  (1918 – 2004)
Salim Ghazal (1931 – 2011)

References

External links
Machghara, Localiban

Populated places in Western Beqaa District
Eastern Orthodox Christian communities in Lebanon
Melkite Christian communities in Lebanon
Shia Muslim communities in Lebanon